Eric Leandro da Silva, or simply Eric  (born March 8, 1989 in São José do Rio Preto), is a Brazilian professional football striker. He currently plays for Penapolense.

Made professional debut for São Paulo in a 1-2 away defeat to Atlético-PR in the Campeonato Brasileiro on December 2, 2007. Eric replaced Diego Tardelli in the 73rd minute of the match.

Honours
São Paulo
Brazilian League: 2007

External links
 CBF
 rsssfbrasil no.402

References

1989 births
Living people
People from São José do Rio Preto
Brazilian footballers
São Paulo FC players
Barretos Esporte Clube players
Botafogo Futebol Clube (SP) players
Association football forwards
Footballers from São Paulo (state)